Amyloflagellula is a genus of fungi in the family Marasmiaceae.

Species

 A. inflata Agerer & Boidin 1981
 A. pseudoarachnoidea (Dennis) Singer 1966
 A. pulchra (Berk. & Broome) Singer 1966
 A. verrucosa Agerer & Boidin 1981

See also

List of Marasmiaceae genera

External links

Marasmiaceae
Agaricales genera
Taxa named by Rolf Singer